is a private junior college in  Hanyū, Saitama Prefecture, Japan, established in 1983 as Saitama Junshin Women's Junior College. The present name was adopted in 2007.

External links
 Official website 

Educational institutions established in 1983
Private universities and colleges in Japan
Universities and colleges in Saitama Prefecture
1983 establishments in Japan
Japanese junior colleges
Hanyū, Saitama